The two-state solution for the Cyprus dispute refers to the proposed permanent division of the island of Cyprus into a Turkish Cypriot state in the north and a Greek Cypriot state in the south, as opposed to the various proposals for reunification that have been suggested since the island was split into two by the 1974 Turkish invasion. The two-state solution would entail the legalisation of the status quo, where Greek Cypriots govern the southern part of the island and Turkish Cypriots govern the northern part, the latter of which is currently not recognised by any country other than Turkey.

On 14 December 2019, Foreign Minister of Northern Cyprus Kudret Özersay said a two-state solution to the issue was "close to hand". On 23 February 2020, Ersin Tatar, who was then the prime minister of Northern Cyprus and was elected its president eight months later, said that "a forced marriage cannot be successful". He elaborated, "We are different, we speak Turkish and they speak Greek. We are Muslims and they are Christians. The new generation does not know each other at all. A child who was 10 in 1974 is now 55, he has grandchildren. We are separated."

Support for two-state solution
In general, Turkey has often expressed its support for the two-state solution as an alternative to reunification, most notably by Turkish President Recep Tayyip Erdogan during his visit to majority Turkish North Nicosia in 2014. According to Greek Cypriot media, the two-state solution is pushed by Turkey in case the UN-mediated peace process fails.

In December 2021, the President of Northern Cyprus Ersin Tatar said that there are two separate states on the island and the Turkish Cypriot side will not accept a solution on the basis of a federation and it will not step back from the new policy of two separate states, which is fully supported by Turkey.

On 30 January, 2022, the Turkish Cypriot president Tatar specified that the sovereign equality and the equal international status of the Turkish Cypriots are non-negotiable.

Polls
In 2007, the Turkish Republic of Northern Cyprus performed a poll on the topic, with 60% of Turkish Cypriots supporting the idea of the two-state solution. Another poll in 2009, made by KADEM research, showed 77.9% support among Turkish Cypriots with 63% casting doubt over the success of the peace negotiations.

In April 2009, an opinion poll conducted for the CyBC showed that the majority of Greek Cypriots supported partition.

In a 2010 opinion poll, 84% of Greek Cypriots and 70% of Turkish Cypriots agreed with the sentiment that "the other side would never accept the actual compromises and concessions that are needed for a fair and viable settlement".

On 16 November 2019, a European Social Survey poll revealed that 13.9% of Greek Cypriots were in favor of the two-state solution, while 13.7% were neither for or against it but could tolerate it if necessary. It also showed that 18% of Greek Cypriots were in favor of keeping things the same, and that 31.2% were neither for or against it but could tolerate it if necessary. The poll concluded that 49.2% of Greek Cypriots were not against the current situation, while 27.6% were not against the two-state solution.

According to a January 2020 poll by Gezici, the two-state solution had a support rate of 81.3% among Turkish Cypriots.

In an opinion poll conducted by Cypronetwork among Greek Cypriots on behalf of the Cyprus Broadcasting Corporation (CyBC) in 2022, 18% stated that the best solution to the Cyprus problem was two separate states; the same figure was 4% in May 2021.

Opposition to two-state solution
The UN has tried to achieve the solution of the dispute via the reunification of Cyprus based on a federal model, with the Annan Plan as the most concrete example, though this was voted down by Greek Cypriots in 2004.

See also
Taksim (politics)

References

Cyprus peace process